The 1928 Australian federal election was held in Australia on 17 November 1928. All 75 seats in the House of Representatives and 19 of the 36 seats in the Senate were up for election. The incumbent Nationalist–Country coalition, led by Prime Minister Stanley Bruce won a record fifth consecutive election defeating the opposition Labor Party led by James Scullin.

The election was held in conjunction with a referendum on Commonwealth–State relations, which was carried.

Future Prime Ministers John Curtin and Ben Chifley both entered parliament at this election. Both then lost their seats in the 1931 election and did not re-enter parliament until 1934 and 1940 respectively.

Results

House of Representatives

Notes
 Independent: William McWilliams (Franklin, Tas.).
 Twelve members were elected unopposed – three Labor, five Nationalist, and four Country.

Senate

Seats changing hands

 Members listed in italics did not contest their seat at this election.

In the Division of Indi, the sitting candidate Robert Cook lost his seat after forgetting to file nomination papers, resulting in Labor candidate Paul Jones winning the seat unopposed.

See also
 Candidates of the Australian federal election, 1928
 Members of the Australian House of Representatives, 1928–1929
 Members of the Australian Senate, 1929–1932

References
University of WA  election results in Australia since 1890
Two-party-preferred vote since 1919

Federal elections in Australia
1928 elections in Australia
November 1928 events